Bigod 20 was a German EBM/techno band which was formed in 1988 by music producers Andreas Tomalla (a.k.a. Talla 2XLC and formerly of the band Moskwa TV) and Markus Nikolai (a.k.a. Jallokin). Nikolai, together with Thomas Franzmann, run the Berlin based Perlon record label.

History
In the late 1980s, Tomalla and Nikolai formed the band Pluuto under Tomalla's own Technodrome Records (TDI Records) label. At the time, Tomalla was also involved in the production of several other projects such as Tribantura and his other collaborations Axodry, Robotiko Rejekto, Moskwa TV, and Microchip League.

In 1988, the duo released the single "Body to Body" under the name Bigod 20 as part of Tomalla's newly founded Music Research label, which eventually evolved into Zoth Ommog Records.

In 1989, Tomalla and Nikolai formed a new project under the name Umo Detic whose second single, "Carpe Diem", would later be re-envisioned as a Bigod 20 single.

In 1990, Bigod 20 released the single "The Bog," which became a club hit and resulted in a record deal with Sire Records. The single featured a strong Front 242 influence, due in no small part to having the guest vocal work of Front 242 lead man Jean-Luc De Meyer.

In 1991 Tomalla and Nikolai joined up with musician Thomas Franzmann (a.k.a. Zip Campisi). The group's first full-length album, Steel Works! was released by Sire Records in 1992. The album included the single "On the Run," and the electropop-influenced cover of Madonna's "Like a Prayer." A second single, "It's Up To You," followed soon afterward.

In 1994, its second full-length album, Supercute, was released along with the single "One".

Perlon
In 1997, Nikolai and Thomas Franzmann (aka Zip) launched Perlon Records. It is a minimal techno and microhouse label whose sound features vocals and peppery sounds. It is a vinyl only label, apart from a few compilations and mixes released on CD. No released have been made available online in any digital format.

Perlon has run a monthly party at Berlin's Panorama Bar, 'Get Perlonized' since its opening in 2005, featuring only DJs who have also released on the label. The record label is known for its distinctive graphic design, done for every release by Chris Rehberger of the graphic design studio Double Standards.

Discography

Albums
 Steel Works! (LP/CD Zoth Ommog - Sire/Reprise/Warner Bros. 1992)
 Supercute (CD Zoth Ommog - Sire/Reprise/Warner Bros. 1994)

Singles
 Body & Energize (12"/MCD TDI/ZYX Records 1988)
 America (12"/MCD TDI/ZYX Records 1988)
 Acid to Body (as "20") (12"/CDS TDI/ZYX Records 1988)
 The Bog (12"/CDS Zoth Ommog - Sire/Reprise/Warner Bros. 1990)
 Carpe Diem (12"/MCD Sire/Reprise/Warner Bros. 1991)
 On the Run (12"/CDS Zoth Ommog Records - Sire/Reprise/Warner Bros. 1992)
 It's Up To You (CDS Zoth Ommog/Semaphore 1993)
 Like a Prayer (CDS Zoth Ommog/Semaphore 1993)
 One (MCD Zoth Ommog - Sire/Reprise/Warner Bros. 1994)

References

External links 
 
 
 
 Official Perlon website
 Discogs: Perlon
 Resident Advisor: Perlon

German electronic music groups
German techno music groups
Electronic body music groups
Musical groups established in 1988
German industrial music groups
German alternative rock groups
Sire Records artists
Zoth Ommog Records artists